Lily is an American comedy variety show television special aired by CBS Television in 1973. The writing crew of 15 all received an Emmy Award for their efforts on this show.

This program was the first of three specials, preceding Lily in 1974, and The Lily Tomlin Special in 1975.

References

External links
 
 
 

CBS television specials
1973 television specials